The Black Marble is a 1980 mystery/romantic comedy film directed by Harold Becker and starring Robert Foxworth, Paula Prentiss and Harry Dean Stanton. It is based on the 1978 novel by Joseph Wambaugh.

Plot
Pragmatic Sgt. Natalie Zimmerman of the LAPD is paired with Sgt. Valnikov, a romantic detective of Russian descent who is going through a midlife crisis and who drinks heavily due to the pressures of his job. Together they investigate the kidnapping of a Beverly Hills socialite's valuable pet dog. It was carried out by sleazy gambler Philo Skinner, who runs a beauty parlor for pets and is desperately in need of cash to cancel his debts.

The teaming of the officers not only helps Valnikov to put himself together, but the pair also falls in love. While containing more humorous elements than most of Joseph Wambaugh's stories, it continues to explore Wambaugh's common theme of the psychological burdens of police work.

The title of the film comes from a phrase used by Natalie. The term "black marble" is synonymous to choosing the short straw or having bad luck. She states that she is always picking the black marble and does not want to anymore. She initially considers Valnikov a "black marble," but ultimately no longer believes this to be true.

Cast
Robert Foxworth as Sgt. A.M. Valnikov
Paula Prentiss as Sgt. Natalie Zimmerman
Harry Dean Stanton as Philo Skinner
Barbara Babcock as Madeline Whitfield
John Hancock as Clarence Cromwell
Raleigh Bond as Capt. 'Hipless' Hooker
Judy Landers as Pattie Mae
Pat Corley as Itchy Mitch
Paul Henry Itkin as Det. Bullets Bambarella
Richard Dix as Alex Valnikov
Jorge Cervera Jr. as Dr. Rivera
Marilyn Chris as Marvis Skinner
Doris Belack as Married Woman
Michael Dudikoff as Millie's houseboy
Lou Cutell as Mr. Limpwood
Anne Ramsey as Bessie Callahan
Michael D. Gainsborough as Capt. John "Jack" Packerton
Robin Raymond as Millie
Billy Beck as Man at Cemetery
Herta Ware as Grand Duchess
Christopher Lloyd as Arnold's Collector
Adele Malis-Morey as Woman at Cemetery
James Woods as The Fiddler
Jane Daly as Bullets' Girlfriend

Production
After the success of The Onion Field in 1979, writer Wambaugh joined producer Frank Capra Jr. to make this dramatic comedy. Both films conform a diptych about the private lives of police officers, under the direction of Harold Becker. Actor James Woods, the protagonist of The Onion Field, also appears in this one, in a cameo as a fiddler.

The producers wanted actress Paula Prentiss for the role of Natalie Zimmerman. After the release of The Stepford Wives in 1975, she had decided to raise her children and thereafter only made television movies, such as Having Babies II and Friendships, Secrets and Lies. For her comeback to films, Prentiss was asked to gain weight to play Zimmerman's character.

Reception
Roger Ebert, in his Chicago Sun-Times review, which was written on February 22, 1980, gave the film three-and-a-half of a possible four stars. Ebert described it as an "unusual and distinctive comedy," and concluded: "This isn't a seamless piece of work, but it's infectious and charming."

Although The Black Marble was not a commercial hit, it won the Edgar Allan Poe Award for film given by the association Mystery Writers of America.

The Black Marble holds a 36% rating on Rotten Tomatoes based on six reviews.

Awards
1981 Edgar Allan Poe Awards
Edgar Allan Poe Award for Best Motion Picture — Harold Becker

References

External links

1980 films
American crime drama films
Embassy Pictures films
1980s English-language films
Films based on American novels
1980s crime drama films
Films directed by Harold Becker
1980 drama films
1980s American films